The following highways are numbered 371:

Canada
Newfoundland and Labrador Route 371
 Quebec Route 371
Saskatchewan Highway 371

Japan
 Japan National Route 371

United States
  U.S. Route 371 (former)
  U.S. Route 371
  California State Route 371
  Colorado State Highway 371
  Florida State Road 371
  Georgia State Route 371
  Maryland Route 371
  Minnesota State Highway 371
  Minnesota State Highway 371 Business
  Missouri Route 371
  New York State Route 371
  Ohio State Route 371
  Pennsylvania Route 371
  Puerto Rico Highway 371
  Tennessee State Route 371
  Texas State Highway Spur 371
  Virginia State Route 371
  Wyoming Highway 371